The My Dear Stakes is a Canadian Thoroughbred horse race run annually in late June at Woodbine Racetrack in Toronto, Ontario. Open to two-year-old fillies, it is contested over a distance of five furlongs on Polytrack and currently carries a purse of approximately $101,000 +.

The race was named for the retrospective American Champion Older Female Horse of 1923, My Dear, whose greatest performances came at the Old Woodbine Race Course. Inaugurated at the now defunct Thorncliffe Park Raceway in Toronto, in 1956 the race was moved to the Old Woodbine Race Course then the following year to the newly constructed Woodbine Racetrack. Contested at five furlongs from 1949 through 1968, it was raced at six furlongs from 1969 through 1975. Since 1976 it has been run at its original five furlong distance.

The My Dear Stakes was contested in two divisions in 1953, 1955, 1969, 1979, 1986. There was no race in 1947.

Records
Speed  record: 
 0:56.73 - Midst (2009) (at current 5 furlong distance)

Most wins by an owner:
 5 - Stafford Farms (1961, 1962, 1969, 1971, 1977)

Most wins by a jockey:
 5 - Robin Platts (1969, 1970, 1977, 1979, 1984)
 5 - David Clark (1983, 1989, 1999, 2003, 2005)
 5 - Todd Kabel  (1991, 1992, 1996, 2002, 2007)

Most wins by a trainer:
 7 - John Passero (1951, 1955 (2), 1956, 1959, 1961, 1962)

Winners of the My Dear Stakes

References
 Woodbine Racetrack
 The My Dear stakes at Pedigree query

Ungraded stakes races in Canada
Flat horse races for two-year-old fillies
Woodbine Racetrack
Recurring sporting events established in 1941